Nikolai Paul Kornelius Molvik (28 August 1905 – 9 July 1981) was a Norwegian politician for the Christian Democratic Party.

He was born in Herøy.

He was elected to the Norwegian Parliament from Bergen in 1965, but was not re-elected in 1969. He had previously served in the position of deputy representative during the term 1958–1961, for Møre og Romsdal

Molvik was involved in local politics in Volda, Ålesund, Kristiansund, and Bergen.

References

1905 births
1981 deaths
Christian Democratic Party (Norway) politicians
Members of the Storting
20th-century Norwegian politicians